Stawiski  is a town in northeastern Poland, situated within Kolno County, in Podlaskie Voivodeship, approximately  east of Kolno and  west of the regional capital Białystok. Stawiski is the administrative seat of Gmina Stawiski. From 1946 to 1975 it belonged administratively to Białystok Voivodeship, and from 1975 to 1998 to Łomża Voivodeship. The town is situated on the Dzierzbia River.

According to Central Statistical Office (Poland), the population of Stawiski as of 31 December 2008 was 2,417 persons.

History
Stawiski was established in 1407–1411. It received city rights around 1688. The Franciscan Order built a monastery there in 1791. The monks were expelled from Stawiski in 1867 during the Partitions, as punishment for supporting the Polish January Uprising against the Russian imperial rule. The town was destroyed by fire in 1812 in the course of the French campaign against Russia, and rebuilt again, to become trades and commercial centre known for its furs, fabrics and hats in Congress Poland. Stawiski was burned to the ground once more during the Russian–Prussian war of 1915, soon before the re-establishment of the sovereign Republic of Poland. The Polish army fought a battle with the Bolsheviks there in July 1920 during the Polish-Soviet War.

Jewish community

Jewish life in Stawiski had been separate from that of the rest of the town's inhabitants. The Jews had established many institutions of their own, including synagogues and Jewish schools and libraries. By 1932, over 50% of Stawiski's population, some 2,000 persons, was Jewish.

During the Invasion of Poland in September 1939, Stawiski was initially occupied by Germany. During the month-long German occupation, German soldiers raped Jewish women and plundered Jewish property. Some Poles who had been ordered to supervise Jewish labor brigades humiliated the conscripted workers. After a Stawiski priest blamed the Jews for the murder of some German soldiers, the Germans executed several Jews, burned down the small synagogue or perhaps a bet midrash, and set fire to part of the town. The Germans deported a group of able-bodied male Jews (and Christians) to forced labor camps in East Prussia. After some three weeks, the Germans passed control of Stawiski to Soviet forces.

Soviet rule lasted until the Germans returned to the town in June 1941 during Operation Barbarossa. Local Poles welcomed the arriving Germans with flowers, and German army scouts who arrived on 27 June noted the Poles' hatred for the Jews. Local Poles, mostly recently released from Soviet prisons, asked German permission to take revenge on the Jews and killed some 70 of them. In early July 1941 the Germans instigated a pogrom in which Polish mobs armed with iron bars murdered some 300 Jews. Some Poles were motivated by revenge against earlier Soviet supporters. A German Einsatzkommando was present in the town during 4–5 July 1941. A similar, better known, atrocity took place on 10 July 1941 in nearby Jedwabne.

Beginning on 17 August 1941, the Germans executed most of Stawiski's Jewish community. Some 900 able-bodied Jews were killed in a ditch near Mątwica, where Jewish women and children from Kolno and Jews from Mały Płock were also executed. Some 700 persons, mostly infants, the elderly, and the handicapped, were killed in Płaszczatka (or Stawiski) Forest.

Some 60 to 105 Jews remained, mainly skilled workers and their families, who were confined to a ghetto. Some Jews from Stawiski who survived in hiding sought refuge in the Łomża Ghetto, others remained hidden until permitted by the Germans to work as farm laborers. On 2 November 1942 the ghetto was closed and its occupants were transferred to a transit camp in Bogusze, and from there were sent to the Auschwitz and Treblinka extermination camps.

Some 50 Stawiski Jews managed to evade deportation, but most of them were found and executed in subsequent searches. Some of the hiding Jews were denounced by Poles, and at least 11 of them were murdered by local Poles in nearby Mały Płock gmina.

Only a few of the 2,000 pre-war Jewish inhabitants of Stawiski survived the Holocaust.

Sport
A local soccer team, GKS Stawiski, was founded in 2008 and as of 2018 plays in the regional A-class league.

Economy
The main branch of local economy is agriculture, based on individual arable farms producing crops for local processing as well as raising farm animals for the market. Apart from farming, trade and service industries cover the needs of the inhabitants. The overall number of people employed in the gmina's economy is 3,545. The breakdown of main employment sectors is as follows. Farming and forestry: 2,304. Industry: 177. Trade and services: 727. Education, health services: 288. Administration and policing: 35.

The town's revenue in 2003 (including its surroundings) amounted 4.299 mln zloty. Net income was 900,000 zloty. However, expenses of the commune exceeded its profits in that period, and amounted to 4.679 mln zloty. Gross revenue and net profits fluctuate depending on expenditures in the public sector, such as environmental protection, water management, dump disposal, sewers, etc.

Notable residents
Stawiski is the hometown of the famous chess player Akiba Rubinstein. In the main square, there is a monument to Stanisław Steczkowski Zagończyk, who, together with his four brothers, fought in the underground Polish Home Army in 1942–1945.

Notes

References

Cities and towns in Podlaskie Voivodeship
Kolno County
Łomża Governorate
Białystok Voivodeship (1919–1939)
Warsaw Voivodeship (1919–1939)
Belastok Region
Holocaust locations in Poland